John Kelly Bohnet (born January 18, 1961) is a former Major League Baseball pitcher who played for one season. He played for the Cleveland Indians.

External links

1961 births
Living people
Cleveland Indians players
Baseball players from California
Major League Baseball pitchers
Batavia Trojans players
Waterloo Indians players
Chattanooga Lookouts players
Charleston Charlies players
Buffalo Bisons (minor league) players